Lake Conasauga is a  lake in the Lake Conasauga Campground located near the summit of Grassy Mountain in the Chattahoochee National Forest in northern Georgia, United States. It was built by the Civilian Conservation Corps, which finished it in 1940. "Conasauga" is a name derived from the Cherokee language meaning "grass".

Lake Conasauga camp ground is managed by the Armuchee-Cohutta Ranger District of the U.S. Forest Service. The area opens in mid-April and closes in late October

Camping 

The campground has 35 family camping units located directly on the lake and in the surrounding woods with restrooms and water faucets. While each campsite has a tent pad, picnic table, fire ring and lantern post, there is no electricity available on the mountain.

Day use 
In addition to camping, the campground area also offers a Day Use area with a roped-off swimming area, picnic tables, grills, group shelters and restrooms as well as several hiking trails located on Grassy Mountain including the  Lake Conasauga Trail, the  Songbird Trail and the  Grassy Mountain Tower Trail.

The lake was restocked with Bass (fish), bluegill, and trout several years ago and offers fishing from the bank or from the water only from canoes or electric-powered boats that can be launched from a boat ramp located across the lake from the Day Use area.

References

External links 
http://www.fs.fed.us/conf/lkcnacmp.htm
http://www.fs.fed.us/conf/rec/fow/20040630-fow.shtml
SherpaGuides.com
 Forgotten Lakes of the Chattahoochee National Forest
Weekend Guide
Southern Hiker

Protected areas of Murray County, Georgia
Chattahoochee-Oconee National Forest
Conasauga
Campgrounds in the United States
Civilian Conservation Corps in Georgia (U.S. state)
Bodies of water of Murray County, Georgia
1940 establishments in Georgia (U.S. state)